SuspenStories can refer to either of two comic book titles published by EC Comics in the 1950s:

 Crime SuspenStories
 Shock SuspenStories